The Nepali Congress (abbr. NC) is a social democratic political party in Nepal and the largest party in the country. The party has 840,106 members as of the party's 14th general convention in December 2021 making them the largest party by membership in Nepal.

The party is led by former prime minister, Sher Bahadur Deuba since the party's thirteenth general convention in 2016. The party won 89 seats in the 2022 general election and is currently the largest parliamentary group in the House of Representatives.

There have been seven Nepali Congress prime ministers and the party has led the government fourteen times. Matrika Prasad Koirala, a founding member of the party was appointed as the first commoner prime minister following the end of the Rana regime in 1951. Subarna Shumsher Rana, another founding member of the party was also appointed as prime minister in 1958. Congress is the only party in Nepal to have been elected with a majority with the party forming majority governments in 1959, 1991 and 1999 under B.P. Koirala, Girija Prasad Koirala and K.P. Bhattarai respectively with B.P. Koirala becoming the first elected prime minister of the country. The party also formed coalition governments in 1995 and 1998 under Girija Prasad Koirala and Sher Bahadur Deuba. The party emerged as the largest party following the 2013 Constituent Assembly elections and led a coalition government under Sushil Koirala. After the promulgation of the constitution in 2015, the party led coalition governments under Deuba in 2017 and 2021.

The party was formed in 1950 by the merger of the Nepali National Congress and the Nepal Democratic Congress along democratic socialist lines. NC prime ministers led four governments between the fall of the Rana dynasty and the start of the Panchayat era, including the first democratically elected government of Nepal, after the 1959 general election. Starting in the 1990s, the party followed other mainstream, centre-left social democratic parties in moving closer to the political centre through the Third Way.

Background 

In 1947, Bishweshwar Prasad Koirala, published an appeal for a unified struggle of Nepali people against the Rana regime. That same year, some Nepalese got together in Benaras and formed an organization by the name All Indian Nepali National Congress where an ad-hoc committee was established. The initial officers were chairman Devi Prasad Sapkota, vice-president Balchandra Sharma, general secretary Krishna Prasad Bhattarai, and public minister Gopal Prasad Bhattarai, publicity minister. Its Working Committee included Batuk Prasad Bhattarai, Narayan Prasad Bhattarai, and Narendra Regmi, while its coordinator was Bishweshwar Prasad Koirala.

Around the same time, Nepalese located in Calcutta formed another organization by the name All Indian Nepali Gorkha Congress whose chairman was Dharma Narayan Pradhan. Koirala traveled extensively to places such as Benaras, Calcutta, Darjeeling, Assam, Bhaksu, and Dehradhun, and established contact with the Nepalese there. He met with Ganesh Man Singh during the same period. Nepalese representatives from different areas of Nepal and India organized one session in Calcutta. Koirala, Dilli Raman Regmi, Dharma Narayan Pradhan, and Dhan Man Singh Pariyar were present. In the same session, dropping Akhil Bharatiya from its name, the organization was named Nepali National Congress. Tanka Prasad Acharya, who was facing a life-sentence in Kathmandu, was made its chairman. The flag was square-shaped with white, blue, and red colors in succession, with the moon and the sun in its center.

The major four proposals passed by the session were to assist Indians in their independence movement, support Vietnam struggling for freedom against French colonization, ask for the immediate release of imprisoned members of the Nepal Praja Parishad, and initiate a non-violence movement in Nepal for the establishment of an accountable ruling system. The organization's modus operandi was chosen, and attached itself to the civil conscience process in Nepal by establishing Tanka Prasad Acharya as its chairman.

History

Nepali Congress formation, 1946–1950 
The Nepali Congress Party was formed by the merger of Nepali National Congress and Nepal Democratic Congress. The Nepali National Congress was founded by Matrika Prasad Koirala in Calcutta, India on 25 January 1946. The Nepal Democratic Congress was founded by Subarna Shumsher Rana in Calcutta on 4 August 1948. The two parties merged on 10 April 1950 to form the Nepali Congress and Koirala became its first president. The party called for an armed revolution against the Rana regime.

During the Bairgania Conference in Bairgania, Bihar, on 27 September 1950 the Nepali Congress announced an armed revolution against the Rana regime. The president of the party also announced the liquidation of operations in India and that the party would operate only inside Nepal.

After King Tribhuvan took refuge inside the Indian Embassy on 6 November 1950. The Congress Liberation Army decided to take this opportunity to launch attacks against the regime before the King "left Nepalese soil". Matrika and Bisheshwor Prasad Koirala and Subarna Shamsher Rana flew to Purnia, Bihar. They called the commanders posted at different locations inside Nepal to prepare for armed strikes near the Nepal-India border.

On 11 November 1950, at midnight Birgunj was attacked, and by 12 November it fell to the Nepali Congress and the first "People's Government" was declared. The liberation army was able to control most of the eastern hills of Nepal and the town of Tansen in Palpa. After pressure by the Indian government and the mass movement by the Nepali Congress and other political parties, the Rana government finally submitted to their demands and King Tribhuvan returned to the throne, replacing King Gyanendra, who had been crowned king after King Tribhuvan left for India.

Transitional government, 1951–1959 
After the fall of the Rana government, the Nepali Congress led three of the five governments formed before the elections. Matrika Prasad Koirala, the first commoner to become Prime Minister, led the government from 1951 to 1952 and 1953–1955 and Subarna Shamsher Rana led the government from 1958 to 1959. The much delayed elections were finally held in February 1959 and Bishweshwar Prasad Koirala became the first democratically elected Prime Minister of Nepal after the Nepali Congress won 74 of 109 seats in the parliament.

Panchayat government, 1960–1990 
Following a royal coup by King Mahendra in 1960, many leaders of the party, including Koirala, Rana and General Secretary Hora Prasad Joshi, were imprisoned or exiled; others took political refuge in India. Although political parties were prohibited from 1960 to 1989 and remained outlawed during the Panchayat system under the aegis of the Associations and Organizations (Control) Act of 1963, the Nepali Congress persisted. The party placed great emphasis on eliminating the feudal economy and building a basis for socioeconomic development. It proposed nationalizing basic industries and instituting progressive taxes on land, urban housing, salaries, profits and foreign investments. While in exile, the Nepali Congress served as the nucleus around which other opposition groups clustered and instigated popular uprisings in the Hill and Terai regions. During this time, the Nepali Congress refused the overtures of a radical faction of the Communist Party of Nepal for a tactical alliance.

The Nepali Congress demonstrated endurance, but defection, factionalism, and external pressures weakened it over time. Nevertheless, it continued to be the only organized party to press for democratization. In the 1980 government system referendum, it supported the multiparty system in opposition to the panchayat system. The party boycotted the 1981 general election and rejected the new government. The death in 1982 of Bishweshwar Prasad Koirala further weakened the party.

After the party boycotted the 1986 general election to the Rastriya Panchayat, its members were allowed to run in the 1987 Nepalese local elections. In defiance of the demonstration ban, the Nepali Congress organized mass rallies with the communist factions in January 1990 that ultimately triggered the pro-democracy movement.

Post-Panchayat government, 1991–2002 
After the Jana Andolan I, party president Krishna Prasad Bhattarai was invited to form an interim coalition government. In the 1991 general election, the Nepali Congress won 110 of 205 seats but Bhattarai lost his seat and yielded the position of prime minister to Girija Prasad Koirala who held his seat until 1994.

During the 1994 general election, the Nepali Congress lost its majority to Communist Party of Nepal (Unified Marxist–Leninist). The CPN (UML) lacked a majority and formed a minority government. After 46 parliamentarians from the CPN (UML) quit to form the Communist Party of Nepal (Marxist–Leninist), the Nepali Congress formed their own government with the Rastriya Prajatantra Party and Nepal Sadbhawana Party. After CPN (UML) offered Lokendra Bahadur Chand the position of prime minister, the Rastriya Prajatantra Party led a government with the CPN (UML). Internal problems within the Rastriya Prajatantra Party caused one faction led by Surya Bahadur Thapa to lead a government with Nepali Congress and Nepal Sadbhawana Party.

Girija Prasad Koirala again became the Prime Minister in April 1998, leading a Congress minority government after Rastriya Prajatantra and Nepal Sadbhawana quit the government. Eventually, they got support from the CPN (ML) and after their withdrawal the CPN (UML) and Nepal Sadbhawana.

During the 1999 general election, Girija Prasad Koirala stepped aside in favour of Krishna Prasad Bhattarai, who returned as Prime Minister when the Nepali Congress won 111 out of 205 House seats. Bhattarai resigned as prime minister on 16 March 2000 after conflicts between himself and supporters of Girija Prasad Koirala. In the party's first open leadership election, the parliamentarians selected Girija Prasad Koirala as their leader by 69-43 votes over Sher Bahadur Deuba. Accordingly, King Birendra designated Girija Prasad Koirala as prime minister on 20 March.

On 8 August 2000, Koirala dismissed the Minister of Water Resources, Khum Bahadur Khadka, for calling for Koirala's resignation. Although Koirala beat back another challenge by Deuba's supporters at a party convention in January 2001, he resigned as Prime Minister on 19 July. Deuba then defeated Secretary General Sushil Koirala, 72–40, for the party leadership and was designated prime minister by the king.

In May 2002, the party's disciplinary committee expelled Deuba for failing to consult the party before seeking a parliamentary extension of the country's state of emergency. Deuba's supporters then expelled Koirala at a general convention in June. Deuba registered his faction as the Nepali Congress (Democratic), following a decision by the Election Commission that the Koirala faction held ownership of the name Nepali Congress, taking 40 of the party's lower house representatives with him.

King Gyanendra's rule, 2002–2006 
In the months following the King's October 2002 decisions to dissolve the House of Representatives and replace Prime Minister Deuba with Rastriya Prajatantra's Lokendra Bahadur Chand, the party joined the CPN (UML) and other, smaller parties in challenging the constitutionality of the moves. The party played a significant role in the formation of the Seven Party Alliance (SPA), which launched a series of street protests against the King's regression. The Seven Party Alliance had earlier avoided the Communist Party of Nepal (Maoist) CPN-M and their violent methods, signed a 12-point understanding in Delhi in November 2005. The agreement contained three key commitmentsm, namely that the SPA endorsed CPN-M's fundamental demand for elections to a constituent assembly; the Maoists reciprocated with an assurance that they accepted a multi-party system, which was the SPA's prime concern. The SPA and the Maoists agreed to launch a peaceful mass movement against the monarchy.

Constituent Assembly, 2006–2015 
On 26 April 2006, the king reinstated the dissolved parliament and formed a small government under the premiership of Girija Prasad Koirala, the president of the Nepali Congress. In November 2006, the government and the CPN-M signed a Comprehensive Peace Accord in India and the Nepalese Civil War formally ended.

On 24 September 2007, the Nepali Congress (Democratic) and Nepali Congress unified as a single party with the 2008 Constituent Assembly election looming. Following the first Madhesh movement, former deputy speaker and senior leader of the party Mahantha Thakur, who had led a committee that held talks with the Madheshi Jana Adhikar Forum, broke away and formed the Terai Madhesh Loktantrik Party with other Madheshi leaders. Girija Prasad Koirala remained president of the newly unified party. The party placed second with 110 out of 575 elected seats in the Constituent Assembly election, winning only half as many seats as CPN-M.

The party joined the coalition government headed by Madhav Kumar Nepal in May 2009. Girija Prasad Koirala angered some in the party by nominating his daughter Sujata Koirala to be Foreign Minister. In June, in a contested election for leader of the party's parliamentary group, Ram Chandra Poudel defeated Deuba. The 12th General Convention of the Nepali Congress was held in Kathmandu from 17 to 21 September 2010. The convention elected Sushil Koirala as the party president.

After the Constituent Assembly of Nepal was dissolved by Prime Minister Baburam Bhattarai after failure to draft a new constitution before the deadline. In the resulting 2013 Constituent Assembly election, the party emerged as the largest party winning 196 of the 575 elected seats. Along with CPN (UML), under the leadership of Sushil Koirala, they formed a new coalition government. The new Constitution of Nepal was promulgated under his leadership on 20 September 2015.

Federal Nepal, 2015–2020 

Sushil Koirala resigned as prime minister on 10 October 2015 after losing support from CPN (UML). Nepali Congress joined the government again in August 2016 under the leadership of Bimlendra Nidhi, after backing Pushpa Kamal Dahal to become prime minister. According to their agreement, Dahal resigned on 24 May 2017 paving the way for Deuba to become prime minister for a fourth time on 6 June 2017.

On 22 April 2017, the Akhanda Nepal Party led by Kumar Kahadka joined the Nepali Congress ahead of the 2017 local elections. Nepali Congress won 11,456 seats including 266 mayoral or chairman positions. The party also won mayor posts in Lalitpur and Biratnagar. Ahead of the 2017 general and provincial elections, Nepal Loktantrik Forum led by former Nepali Congress leader, Bijay Kumar Gachhadar merged into the party.  Similarly, a group from Federal Socialist Forum, Nepal led by MP Abhishek Pratap Shah, a group from CPN (UML) led by MP Mohan Singh Rathore and Rabin Chaudhary, a goroup from Rastriya Janata Party Nepal led by MP Jangi Lal Ray, a group from CPN (Maoist Centre) led by former Minister and MP Sambhu Lal Shrestha joined the party ahead of the 2017 election.

The party won 63 seats to the House of Representatives becoming the second largest party. The party could win only 23 seats under first past the post and many influential leaders including Ram Chandra Paudel, Ram Sharan Mahat, Bimalendra Nidhi, Krishna Prasad Sitaula, and Arjun Narsingh KC lost in their constituencies. The party won 113 seats in provincial assemblies and became the largest opposition in six out of seven provinces. The party won 13 seats in the 2018 National Assembly election. After the National Assembly election, Deuba resigned as prime minister on 15 February 2018, paving the way for a new government under CPN (UML). The party's under performance in the election caused many elements inside the party to call for Deuba's resignation. Prakash Man Singh stood against Deuba for the election of the parliamentary party leader, but Deuba won the vote 44–19.

Political crisis of 2020–2021 

Nepali Congress was back to centre of Nepalese politics since the political crisis 2020 which it had lost after deciding from the position of singe largest party of nation. This happened after split in Nepal Communist Party and Janata Samajbadi Party due to personal interest and difference in ideology of core leaders.

The internal crisis led to dissolution of parliament (both house of representative and lower house of parliament) by Khadga Prasad Oli twice within six months. It was approved by the president but Supreme court denied the legality of such decision by Oli. After the supreme court's historic decision, both the parliaments were reinstated.

After facing the vote for confidence in parliament, Oli lost the vote for confidence. Again he dissolved the parliament on 22 May 2021 and it was approved by president unanimously against the signatures submitted claiming majority to Nepali Congress. Still, 146 sitting members of HOR filed a case in supreme court against the decision and approval of president. Previously, they had submitted majority signatures to president asking to appoint Sher Bahadur Deuba as the next prime-minister of Nepal. On 12 July 2021, the Supreme Court stated the decision of parliament dissolution was unlawful. Similarly, it ordered the appointment Deuba as the next Prime Minister of Nepal citing article 76(5) of the Constitution of Nepal within 28 hours. It stated that the decision made by the president was against the norms of the constitution. On 13 July 2021, President Bidya Devi Bhandari appointed Sher Bahadur Deuba as the Prime Minister without including any article of Constitution and stating as per the order of Court. This created cold dispute and people alleged President Bhandari of forgetting her limits and being tilted to ex-PM Oli. After Deuba declined to take the oath as per the appointment letter, the letter was changed and stated that Deuba was made PM in accordance with article 76(5), marking Deuba's fifth term as PM.

This process of vote of confidence was keenly watched by people from within and outside the country. On 18 July 2021, Minister for Law, Justice and Parliamentary Affairs of Nepal and Nepali Congress leader Gyanendra Bahadur Karki registered a proposal for vote of confidence in the first meeting of reinstated House of Representatives. Here, CPN(UML) got divided when only 69% MP from UML voted against Deuba. People's Socialist Party, Nepal remained united in voting for the Deuba despite ongoing process of party division. Hence, the government got vote of confidence with no party purely as opposition, a first in the history of Nepal.

Out of total 249 present for the vote, 165 voted for Deuba while 1 remained undecided. This includes 83 from CPN (UML) who voted against Deuba. 37 of them were either absent or voted in favour of Deuba. 22 MPs from Madhav Nepal faction and some rebel from Oli faction from CPN (UML) voted for Deuba. This was a historic win with nearly 66.3% of votes of total present in parliament. It was totally unexpected with just 61 voters from Nepali Congress. It was a big set back to Oli when 38 CPN (UML) MPs didn't vote against Deuba. This was seen as a result of Oli's "autocratic" rule and dissolution of the house twice.

In addition to this, Nepali Congress joined the government of Karnali on 6 June with an agreement of a roatational government. Within a week, Congress also joined the Province No. 2 government, as a result of an internal split in PSPN. Similarly, on 12 June Congress formed a coalition government Gandaki under its own leadership. On 12 August, Congress joined a coalition government in Lumbini formed under the leadership of CPN (Maoist Centre), with a provision of rotational government to be formed in the next few months. On 3 November 2021, Nepali Congress formed Karnali government under its own leadership sworning Jeevan Bahadur Shahi as chief minister of the province.

From 13 to 15 December 2021, Nepali Congress conducted its 14th general convention in the presence of 850,000 active members and nearly 5,000 candidates, re-electing Sher Bahadur Deuba as party president in the second round. The party elected Purna Bahadur Khadka and Dhanraj Gurung vice-presidents of the party. Popular youth leaders Gagan Thapa and Bishwa Prakash Sharma were elected to the executive post of general secretary of the party.

Nepalese election year, 2022-present 
On 13 May 2022, the Sher Bahadur Deuba-led government held local level elections, in which the ruling Nepali Congress swept the polls winning the posts of chiefs in 329 local units out of a total of 753, up from 266 in the last local elections held in 2017. The party secured wins in two metropolitan cities, Lalitpur and Biratnagar, as well as wins in four sub-metropolitan cities of Butwal, Nepalgunj, Janakpur and Itahari. The NC secured the highest vote among contesting parties in the elections.

On 20 November 2022, the Sher Bahadur Deuba-led government held general elections, in which the ruling Nepali Congress emerged as the single largest party at both national and provincial level winning as much as 57 seats of 90 seats it had contested.

Ideology 

The party was founded on the principle of democracy and socialism. In 1956, the party adopted democratic socialism as its ideology for socio-economic transformation. Its foreign policy orientation was to nonalignment and good relations with India. It initially favoured mainstream social democratic policies, but in the late 20th century, began moving closer to the political centre, starting in the 1990s, abandoning some of its previous social democratic policies in favor of those similar to the Third Way.

Electoral performance

Legislative elections

Provincial election

Province 1

Madhesh

Bagmati

Gandaki

Lumbini

Karnali

Sudurpashchim

Local election

Leadership

Presidents 

 Matrika Prasad Koirala (1950–1952)
 Bishweshwar Prasad Koirala (1952–1956, 1957–1982)
 Subarna Shamsher Rana (1956–1957)
 Krishna Prasad Bhattarai (1982–1996)
 Girija Prasad Koirala (1996–2010)
 Sushil Koirala (2010–2016)
 Sher Bahadur Deuba (2016–present)

Vice-presidents 

 Prakash Man Singh (1996–2010)
 Ram Chandra Paudel (1996–2016)
 Gopal Man Shrestha (1996–2010)
 Bimalendra Nidhi (2016–2022)
 Bijay Kumar Gachhadar (2017–2022)
 Dhanraj Gurung (2022–present)
 Purna Bahadur Khadka (2022–present)

General secretaries 

 Girija Prasad Koirala (1982–1996)
 Mahendra Narayan Nidhi (1982–1996)
 Bimalendra Nidhi (1996–2010)
 Kul Bahadur Gurung (1996–2010)
 Ram Baran Yadav (1996–2010)
 Krishna Prasad Sitaula (2010–2016)
 Prakash Man Singh (2010–2016)
 Shashanka Koirala (2016–2022)
 Purna Bahadur Khadka (2016–2022)
 Gagan Kumar Thapa (2022–present)
 Bishwa Prakash Sharma (2022–present)

Prime Ministers of Nepal

List of Deputy Prime Ministers

Chief Ministers

Sister organizations 

According to the website of Nepali Congress, the following are its sister organizations.
 Nepal Student Union (नेपाल विद्यार्थी संघ) 
 Nepal Tarun Dal (नेपाल तरुण दल)
 Nepal Democratic Fighter Society (नेपाल प्रजातान्त्रिक सेनानी समाज) 
 Nepal Peasants' Union (नेपाल किसान संघ) 
 Nepal Adivasi Janajati Sangh (नेपाल आदिवासी जनजाति संघ) 
 National Democratic Handicapped Association (राष्ट्रिय प्रजातान्त्रिक अपाङ्ग संघ) 
 Nepal Tamang Association (नेपाल तामाङ संघ) 
 Nepal Thakur Society (नेपाल ठाकुर समाज) 
 Nepal Woman Association (नेपाल महिला संघ) 
 Nepal Dalit Sangh (नेपाल दलित संघ) 
 Nepal Ex Army Association (नेपाल भूतपूर्व सैनिक संघ)
 Nepal Press Union (नेपाल प्रेस युनियन) 
 Nepal Civil Service Employees' Union (नेपाल निजामती कर्मचारी युनियन) 
 Nepal Cultural Association (नेपाल सांस्कृतिक संघ) 
 Nepal Teachers Association (नेपाल शिक्षक संघ) 
 Nepal Trade Union Congress (नेपाल ट्रेड युनियन कांग्रेस)
 Nepal Prajatantra Senani Sangh (नेपाल प्रजातान्त्रिक सेनानी संघ)
 Nepal Indigenous Nationality Association (नेपाल आदिवासी जनजाती संघ )

See also 
 Biratnagar jute mill strike
 Congress Mukti Sena

References

External links
 Official website
 Info on the party from FES

 
Politics of the Nepalese Civil War
1950 establishments in Nepal
Social democratic parties in Nepal
Political parties established in 1950